The men's 5000 meter at the 2021 KNSB Dutch Single Distance Championships took place in Heerenveen at the Thialf ice skating rink on Friday 30 October 2020. There were 16 participants.

Statistics

Result

Source:

Referee: Berri de Jonge.  Assistant: Rieks van Lubek  Starter: Jan Rosing

Draw

References

Single Distance Championships
2021 Single Distance